Julie Marie Meyer MBE is an American businesswoman and the author of Welcome to Entrepreneur Country. She is the CEO and member of the board of Viva Investment Partners. She founded Ariadne Capital Limited and Ariadne Capital Malta Limited, and was a co-founder of the networking forum First Tuesday. In 2009, Meyer was a guest on the  online edition of the Dragons' Den TV series.

Early life and education 
Meyer was born in Dearborn, Michigan. She grew up in the Sacramento, California. 

In 1988, Meyer graduated from Valparaiso University with a B.A. degree in English Literature and moved to Paris. In 1997, she received an M.B.A. from INSEAD (Institut Européen d'Administration des Affaires).

Career 
Meyer moved to London in 1998 and worked at NewMedia Investors (later known as Spark Ventures) from 1998 to 1999. In 1998, Meyer co-founded First Tuesday, a networking forum designed to build an online community to connect entrepreneurs and investors, which was sold in 2000.

In August 2000, Meyer founded the investment advisory firm Ariadne Capital. In 2009, Meyer announced the Ariadne Capital Entrepreneurs (ACE) Fund. 

In 2009, she was a panelist in the online version of Dragon's Den. In 2010, Meyer was selected as one of 26 business people tasked with advising the British government on its business policies to encourage entrepreneurship in the United Kingdom.

In 2012, as CEO of Ariadne Capital, Meyer was part of an advisory committee led by entrepreneur James Caan called StartUp Loans that was funded with £82.5 million. In 2015, Ariadne Capital was ordered to pay £50,000 after a contract dispute related to StartUp Loans was heard in court. In 2016, Ariadne paid a £64,500.90 judgment as ordered after a contract dispute with a former employee. 

In 2014, Ariadne Capital hired the public relations firm Lansons Communications. A Lansons employee contacted Wikipedia and the communication was posted on the Talk page of the Julie Meyer article. Ariadne filed a lawsuit against Lansons for more than £100,000 in damages, and Lansons counterclaimed for about £76,000 in unpaid fees. The litigation settled with an undisclosed sum paid to Lansons.

In April 2018, a summons was not successfully served on Meyer in a case in Malta where Meyer claimed to be attempting to pay employees, and her attorney confirmed the money was available and would be paid. By May 2018, the summons continued to not be successfully served on Meyer, and the Malta court indicated the case would continue until Meyer or her co-defendant appeared for a criminal case, regardless of whether the payments were made.

On 11 May 2018 the Malta Financial Services Authority (MFSA) suspended the investment services license of Ariadne Capital Malta Limited with immediate effect, alleging multiple "serious breaches of license conditions".

Since 2018, Meyer is the CEO of Viva investment Partners AG (formerly Pelion Pension Advisors SA) in Switzerland. In February 2022, Meyer was sentenced to a six month suspended sentence by the High Court in the UK, following a judgment of contempt of court for failure to appear in court hearings and follow court orders in a case brought by attorneys Farrer & Co, based on allegations of unpaid fees. Meyer unsuccessfully appealed the suspended sentence.

Awards and honours 

 2000: EY Entrepreneur of the Year
 2002: WEF/Global Leaders for Tomorrow
 2010: INSEAD (Institut Européen d'Administration des Affaires), "50 Alumni who Changed the World"
 2011: ComputerWeekly's "50 most influential people in UK IT" list
 2011: Wired 100
 2011: Member of the Order of the British Empire for Services to Entrepreneurship
 2020: Lifetime Achievement Award from the Stevie Award For Women in Business
 2020: Lifetime Achievement Award from the CEO World Awards

Works and publications

Book

Talks

Personal life 
Meyer is a resident of Switzerland, and has lived in Zurich since October 2018, and is a permanent resident.

References

External links 
 Ariadne Capital
 

American Lutherans
American investors
INSEAD alumni
Valparaiso University alumni
Living people
American women investors
1966 births
21st-century American businesswomen
21st-century American businesspeople